Arthur Selwyn Bean (23 April 1886-4 July 1981) was  Archdeacon of Manchester from 1934 to 1966.
He was educated at Christ’s College, Christchurch, New Zealand  and Keble College, Oxford and ordained in 1910. After a curacy in Rugby he held incumbencies at Ribby with Wrea, Weaste, and Astley. He was an Honorary Chaplain to the Forces during World War II and an Honorary Chaplain to the Queen from 1952 to 1969.

References

1886 births
People educated at Christ's College, Christchurch
Alumni of Keble College, Oxford
Archdeacons of Manchester
Honorary Chaplains to the Queen
1981 deaths